Flavio Emilio Scogna  (born 16 August 1956 in Savona, Liguria) is an Italian composer and conductor.

Biography 
After studying at the Conservatory of Genoa, Scogna subsequently went on to further his studies in composition and conducting, amongst others, with Franco Ferrara in Rome (1982/1983), with Franco Donatoni and Aldo Clementi at the University of Bologna. In 1984 he went on to specialize with Luciano Berio with whom he was to strike up a strong relationship based on friendship and professional respect. This was to have a decisive effect on his development as a conductor. In 1988, along with Berio, he carried out the transcription and elaboration of Wir bauen eine Stadt by Paul Hindemith, which was performed in the same year in the Konzerthaus in Wien.
Scogna's works are performed in the most prestigious places (Accademia Nazionale di S.Cecilia, Teatro Comunale di Firenze, Centre Pompidou in Paris, Konzerthaus in Vienna, Auditorium Nacional in Madrid, Teatro dell’Opera di Roma) and they are recorded on RCA, BMG Ariola as well as broadcast by the major European radios and televisions (RAI, BBC, RNE, BRT, Radio France amongst the others). In 1998 he represented the RAI television network at the Prix Italia, with the radio work "L’Arpa Magica" based on a text by Edoardo Sanguineti. He has given lectures and seminars regarding his own compositions, in Europe and in several colleges in the United States. 
In October 2002 Flavio Emilio Scogna successfully conducted "La memoria perduta" (directed by Pier-Alli), work commissioned by the Rome Opera House.
Besides being a composer, from 1990 he is an international acclaimed Orchestra Conductor both in the classical and operatic repertoire (He has revalued important classics and has often edited them personally, such as Pergolesi, Boccherini and Rossini), in the twentieth century and contemporary repertoire with a very large number of premieres (he is now considered one of the most popular conductors among the major living composers), such as Aldo Clementi, Sylvano Bussotti, Luis De Pablo, Ennio Morricone, Giacomo Manzoni, Adriano Guarnieri and in the historic twentieth century (Erik Satie and Nino Rota, for whom he pressed the first global record of the work "I due timidi").
He directed some of the most important international symphonic orchestras such as the Kiev Philharmonic Orchestra, the Rai Symphonic Orchestra, the RTVE Symphony Orchestra, the Rome Opera House Orchestra, the Hungarian State Symphonic Orchestra, the Raanana Sinfonietta of Israel, the Icelandic Symphonic Orchestra, the Orchestre Philharmonique de Nice, the Orchestre Symphonique et Lyrique de Nancy, the Pomeriggi Musicali di Milano Orchestra, the Sicilian Symphonic Orchestra, the Filarmonica Toscanini Orchestra and the National Academy Orchestra of Santa Cecilia, as well as internationally acclaimed ensembles such as Alternance in Paris, The Accademia Bizantina, Circulo in Madrid and the Ensemble Strumentale Scaligero. In 1995 he directed the opening concert for the celebration of the centenary of the International Music Festival of the Biennale di Venezia with "Quare Tristis" of Adriano Guarnieri.
From 1999 he conducts the Cantelli Orchestra and the Symphonic Orchestra of Italy in Milan for the concerts of the music "NovecentoMusica" Festival with Luigi Pestalozza as artistic director.
Flavio Emilio Scogna's discography is very rich and comprises recordings for RCABMG (RCA Red Seal), Brilliant Classic, Curci, RicordiMediastore, FonitCetra, Dynamic, Tactus and Bongiovanni. 
His CD recording of Schnittke's works (Dymanic S 2030) gained the highest rating (10) given by the magazine Répertoire in the year 2000. 
From 2006 to 2009 he is conductor of the Ensemble Contemporaneo of the National Academy of Santa Cecilia and in 2009 he is Principal Conductor of the Bari's Symphony Orchestra.

Awards
 Premio Vittorio De Sica 2013 for Classical Music

Works and editions
Interludi dialoganti per due chitarre (1981)   							     
Planc per flauto/ottavino, corno inglese, chitarra, glockenspiel, vibrafono, harmonium e clavicembalo (1982)
Due studi per chitarra (1982)  
Musica per tre per oboe, clarinetto e fagotto (1982) 
In divenire per clarinetti in sib e clarinetto basso (un solo esecutore) (1983)
Canto primo per soprano e pianoforte (1983)
Canto secondo per mezzosoprano e pianoforte (1983) 
Canto terzo per baritono e pianoforte (1983) 
Come in un rondò per flauto, vibrafono e arpa (1983) 
Arioso per Guillermo per chitarra (1984)
Incanto per due violini e viola (1985)
Come un’onda di luce per oboe, clarinetto, violino, viola e violoncello (1985)  	
Cadenza seconda per pianoforte (1986)	
Frammento per soprano  e pianoforte (1987)
Concertino per gruppo strumentale (19871997) 						
La mar per marimba (1987) 6’ 
Tre invenzioni per pianoforte (1987) 							
Serenata per gruppo strumentale (1984–88) 
Anton, azione musicale (1984–88) (testi a cura di Claudio Casini e F.E.Scogna)
Risonanze per quartetto d'archi (1988) 
Fluxus per orchestra (1988–1995) 
Verso per flauto, oboe, clarinetto, violino, viola e violoncello
Alternanze per pianoforte e orchestra da camera. (1988–1995) 1 
Rifrazioni per soprano e orchestra (1989) (su testo di Bruno Cagli)
Capriccio per violoncello (1990) 
Rondò per clarinetto in Sib (1990) 
Duplum per sax contralto in Mib (1990) 
Prisma per quartetto di sassofoni	(1990)  
Duplex per quartetto di clarinetti (1990)				
Musica reservata per orchestra d’archi (1990) 
Linee di forza	 per violino (1990) 
Festa	per orchestra da camera (1991) 
Salmo XII per due voci e Orchestra (1991) 
Diaphonia per viola, pianoforte e orchestra d’archi (1991)		
La memoria perduta	 Opera in due atti (1991/1993) su libretto di Gina Lagorio
Trameper tromba in Do (1993) 
Cabaletta per 11 archi (1993)   
Inno per tromba e organo	(1993) 
Tre partite sopra l’aria di Fiorenza (da Frescobaldi) per orchestra (1994)	
Aulos per oboe (1994)					
Concentus per Orchestra (1994–1995) 
Postilla per soprano e strumenti (1996) 
Memorie per voce recitante, violino e midi (1996)  
Notturno italiano per gruppo da camera (1997) 
Amadeus, mio caro… per orchestra da camera (1988)
L’arpa magica per soprano, voce recitante, violino e arpa (1998)					
Ison per flauto, violino e pianoforte (2003)
La realtà, melologo per voce recitante e ensemble (2011) su testi di Pierpaolo Pasolini
Revisioni:  G. PETRASSI, Grand septuor Suvini-Zerboni S.8503 Z.(2008)
Edizioni Ricordi, Milano
Edizioni  Suvini-Zerboni, Milano
Edizioni Sonzogno, Milano
Edizioni Curci, Milano

Discography
Scogna, Segnali per sei dimensioni – Scogna/Orchestra Sinfonica della Rai – RCA Sp10088 1982
Scogna, Incanto – Scogna/Romensemble, RCA Red Seal RL71140 1986
Scogna, cd monografico- Scogna/Symphonia Perusina/Gruppo Musica d’Oggi – RCA CCD3004 1992
Morricone, Betta, De Rossi Re, Lauricella – Scogna/OSA – RCA CCD30046
Pennisi, Achantis – Scogna/Romensemble – RCA RL71138 1986
Respighi, Suite della tabacchiera – Scogna/Romamusica ensemble – Fonotipia SP109101 1991
Schnittke, Concerto grosso – Scogna/Ensemble Terzo suono – Dynamic S2030  2000
Rota, I due timidi/La notte di un nevrastenico – Orch. Filarmonia Veneta Malipiero – Bongiovanni GB2367 2004
Pergolesi, Stabat Mater – Scogna/Rubortone/Onorati/Orchestra Benedetto Marcello – Tactus TC711603 2006
Gorecki, Sinfonia n 3 – Scogna/Caiello/Amadeus Orchestra- Curci 010  2005
Amato, Il principe felice – Scogna/Lavia/Ensemble Strumentale Scaligero – Curci 011 2006
Boccherini, Stabat Mater – Scogna/Vignudelli/Orchestra Benedetto Marcello – Tactus TC711642 2006
Rossini, Petite Messe Solennelle -Scogna, Calandra, Onorati, DiFilippo, Battagion, Carbonara, Polimanti, Pavoni/Coro G. Petrassi-Tactus TC791803 2007
Carrara, Destinazione del sangue- Scogna,Rondoni, Iannone, Fiorino/Nuova Orchestra Scarlatti -Stradivarius str 33841 2009
Vivaldi, In turbato mare irato – Scogna, Divito/Orchestra Benedetto Marcello- Tactus TC 670002  2011
Frisina, Passio Caecilae – Scogna,Vignudelli, Sebasti/Nova Amadeus -Brilliant Classics 9405 2013
De Sica, A life in music – Scogna/Filarmonica Toscanini – Brilliant Classics 94905 2014
Pergolesi, La Serva padrona – Scogna, Nisi,Benetti/Solisti Liriensi -Tactus Tc711606 2014
Carrara, Magnificat – Scogna, Guaitoli/Orchestre Symphonique et Lyrique de Nancy – Brilliant 95213  2015
Bartok,Ghedini,Rota,Hindemith – Scogna/I Solisti Aquilani – Brilliant Classics 95223 2015
Pergolesi/Tarabella – La serva padrona, Il servo padrone – Scogna, Liuzzi, Di Gioia, Pecchioli Orchestra V. Galilei – Brilliant Classics  95360  2018
Menotti, The Telephone, The Medium – Scogna, Hetrzberg, Grante, Samsonova-Khayet/Orchestra Filarmonica Italiana – Brilliant Classics 95361  2018

Sources
 D.E.U.M.M.,Dizionario Enciclopedico Universale della Musica e dei Musicisti (le biografie), vol. VII,p. 202. UTET, Torino 1988.
 EMG, Enciclopedia della Musica, Garzanti, p. 807. Milano 1996
 Von der Weid J,N., Music in XX the Century, Memories, Milano 2002
R.Cresti, Musica presente, tendenze e compositori di oggi", LIM, Lucca 2019
R. Cresti, Per una nuova storia della musica, vol.II p. 612, Napoli, 1987.
R. Badalì, Dizionario della musica italiana, Roma, 1996.
G. Zaccaro, La musica nel Novecento, Roma, 1986
IBC, International who's who in music, p. 771, IBC Cambridge 1990

External links
 Official Site
https://www.treccani.it/enciclopedia/flavio-emilio-scogna
https://www.ricordi.com/it-IT/Composers/S/Scogna-Flavio-Emilio.aspx
https://www.umpgclassical.com/en-GB/Composers/S/Scogna-Flavio-Emilio.aspx
http://www.esz.it/it/cataloghi/musica-contemporanea/305-scogna-flavio-emilio
https://en.schott-music.com/shop/autoren/flavio-emilio-scogna
https://www.sonzogno.it/en/composer?id=1712&lang=en&epoca=1
https://www.gramophone.co.uk/review/bartók-divertimento-ghedini-violin-concerto
http://www.premivittoriodesica.it/premi2013.htm
http://www.pieralli.it/portfolio/la-memoria-perduta-di-flavio-scogna/
https://www.giornaledellamusica.it/recensioni/lopera-ritrova-la-memoria-perduta
https://archivio.unita.news/assets/main/2002/10/27/page_023.pdfhttps://www.youtube.com/channel/UCALSU77lLklmppqgTcSQl1Q
https://www.youtube.com/watch?v=0W5VnjzNXkM
https://musicbrainz.org/artist/a86569bb-7545-43e4-ab75-2cd6c78c1988
http://www.composers21.com/s.htm

People from Savona
Living people
1956 births
Italian male conductors (music)
Italian composers
Italian male composers
21st-century Italian conductors (music)
21st-century Italian male musicians